Gillespie Field station is a Green Line station of the San Diego Trolley in the San Diego suburb of Santee, California. It is located across Marshall Avenue from Gillespie Field, a county airport which also contains an annex of the San Diego Air & Space Museum.

It was ranked worst rail station in California in a 2015 UC Berkeley School of Law study, due to its sparse, unwalkable location and lack of ridership.  Study co-author Elkind was quoted in the press, “I almost wondered if there was really a station out there or if we got the GPS wrong. It looked like cow pastures.”

History
With the opening of the new Green Line in July 2005,  this service was replaced, and Orange Line trolleys began to terminate at this station. (This was due to the path between Gillespie Field and Santee Town Center being single tracked, and having two lines running on that route would cause operational issues.)

Station layout
There are two tracks, each served by a side platform. Just past the station, Santee Town Center-bound service merges onto a single track.

See also
 List of San Diego Trolley stations

References

Green Line (San Diego Trolley)
San Diego Trolley stations
La Mesa, California
Railway stations in the United States opened in 1995
Airport railway stations in the United States
1995 establishments in California